Jayavarman II (c. 770 – 850) (reigned c. 802–850) was a Khmer prince who founded and became the ruler of the Khmer Empire (Cambodia) after unifying the Khmer civilization. The Khmer Empire was the dominant civilization in mainland Southeast Asia from the 9th century until the mid-15th century. Jayavarman II was a powerful Khmer king who declared independence from a polity inscriptions named "Java". Jayavarman II founded many capitals such as Mahendraparvata, Indrapura, Amarendrapura, and Hariharalaya. Before Jayavarman II came to power, there was much fighting among local overlords who ruled different parts of Cambodia. No inscriptions by Jayavarman II have been found. Future kings of the Khmer Empire described him as a warrior and the most powerful king from that time frame that they could recall. Historians formerly dated his reign as running from 802 AD to 835 AD.

Universal monarch 

Jayavarman II is widely regarded as the king that set the foundation of the Angkor period in Cambodian history, beginning with the grandiose consecration ritual he conducted in 802 on Mount Mahendraparvata, now known as Phnom Kulen, to celebrate the independence of the Khmer Empire from "Java". At that ceremony, he was proclaimed a universal monarch (Kamraten jagad ta Raja in Khmer) or God King (Deva Raja in Sanskrit). According to some sources, he had resided for some time in Java during the reign of the Sailendra Dynasty, or "The Lords of Mountains", and as such the concept of Devaraja or God King was ostensibly imported from Java. At that time, the Sailendra Dynasty allegedly ruled over Java, Sumatra, the Malay Peninsula and parts of Cambodia.
An inscription from the Sdok Kak Thom temple recounts that at Mahendraparvata, Jayavarman II took part in a ritual performed by the Brahman Hiranyadama, and his chief priest Lord Sivakaivalya, a devaraja which placed him as a chakravartin, Lord of the Universe.

Taken in sum, the record suggests that Jayavarman and his followers moved over the course of some years from southeast Cambodia to the northwest, subduing various principalities along the way. Jayavarman II founded Hariharalaya near present-day Roluos, the first settlement in what would later become the Khmer Empire. Historian Claude Jacques writes that he first seized the city of Vyadhapura in the southeast, then pushed up the Mekong River to take Sambhupura. He later installed himself at another city state, now known as Banteay Prei Nokor, near present-day Kompong Cham. Jacques believes that from there he pressed on to Wat Pu, seat of a city-state in present-day southern Laos, then moved along the Dangrek Mountains to arrive in the Angkor region. Later he brought pressure on local Khmer leaders located to the west, but they fought back and drove him to the summit of present-day Phnom Kulen, about 50 kilometers east of Angkor, where the Brahman declared independence. Jacques suggests that this step might have been intended to affirm Jayavarman's authority in the face of strong resistance.

Once established in the Angkor region, Jayavarman II appears to have reigned not only in Hariharalaya, located just north of the Tonle Sap lake, but also at a place that inscriptions call Amarendrapura. It has not been positively identified, though some historians believe it to be a now lost settlement at the western end of the West Baray, the eight kilometer-long holy reservoir that was built about two centuries after his death. No single temple is positively associated with Jayavarman, but some historians suggest he may have built Ak Yum, a brick stepped pyramid, now largely ruined, at the southern edge of the West Baray. The temple was a forerunner to the mountain-temple architectural form of later Khmer kings.

Despite his key role in Khmer history, few firm facts survive about Jayavarman. No inscriptions authored by him have been found, but he is mentioned in numerous others, some of them written long after his death. He appears to have been of aristocratic birth, beginning his career of conquest in the southeast of present-day Cambodia. He may have been known as Jayavarman Ibis at that time. “For the prosperity of the people in this perfectly pure royal race, great lotus which no longer has a stalk, he rose like a new flower,” declares one inscription.  Various other details are recounted in inscriptions: he married a woman named Hyang Amrita; and he dedicated a foundation at Lobok Srot, in the southeast.

Sdok Kak Thom

The most valuable inscription concerning Jayavarman II is the one dated to 1052 AD, two centuries after his death, found at the Sdok Kak Thom temple in present-day Thailand. The inscription states “When His Majesty Paramesvara came from Java to reign in the royal city of Indrapura,…Sivakaivalya, the family’s purohit, was serving as his guru and held the post of royal chaplain to His Majesty,” using the king’s posthumous name.  In a later passage, the text says that a Brahman named Hiranyadama, “proficient in the lore of magic power, came from Janapada in response to His Majesty’s having invited him to perform a sublime rite which would release Kambujadesa [the kingdom] from being any longer subject to Java.” The text also recounts the creation of the cult of the devaraja, the key religious ceremony in the court of Jayavarman and subsequent Khmer people.

Interpretations on "Java"
The word in the inscription that has often been translated as "Java" has caused endless debate. Some early scholars, such as George Coedès and Lawrence Palmer Briggs, have established the notion that it refers to the island of Java in present-day Indonesia. The mythical stories of battles between the Khmers and Javanese correspond in their view to the Sailendra dynasty that ruled both Java and Sumatran Srivijaya.

Later scholars such as Charles Higham doubt that the word refers to the island. Michael Vickery has re-interpreted the word to mean "the Chams", the Khmers' neighbors to the east, described a chvea.

Other scholars like Takashi Suzuki suggest that "Java" is on the Malay Peninsula instead, or particularly Kedah, the center of Srivijaya under the Sailendra dynasty.

Historical assessment

More broadly, debate continues as to whether Jayavarman II’s rule truly represented a seminal turning point in Khmer history, the creation of an independent unified state from small feuding principalities, or was instead part of a long process toward that end. Inscriptions indicate that later Khmer kings treated him as the august first in their line and font of their own legitimacy, but Hindu civilization had existed already for centuries in the region; the fact that Jayavarman was the second monarch to carry that name is a sign that there was already long line of kings of significant states in the region.<ref>Mabbett and Chandler, The Khmers’’ pp. 87-89.</ref>

Posthumous name
Jayavarman II died in 850 AD and received the posthumous name of Parameshwara, "the supreme ruler," an epithet of Sri Shiva. After him, the throne was held by his son Jayavarman III and two other kings of the family into which he had married. He was formally honored along with these two kings and their wives in the Preah Ko temple in Roulous, built by King Indravarman I and inaugurated in 880 AD.

 Notes 

 References 
 Sak-Humphry, Chhany. The Sdok Kak Thom Inscription.  The Edition of the Buddhist Institute 2005.
 Higham, Charles. The Civilization of Angkor.  University of California Press 2001.
 Briggs, Lawrence Palmer. The Ancient Khmer Empire. Transactions of the American Philosophical Society 1951.
 Mabbett, Ian and Chandler, David. The Khmers. Blackwell Publishers Ltd. 1996.
 Coedès, Georges. Les capitales de Jayavarman II.. Bulletin de l'EFEO (Paris), 28 (1928).
 
 Jacques, Claude and Lafond, Philippe. The Khmer Empire: Cities and Sanctuaries from 5th to 13th Century. River Books [2007].
 Jacques, Claude. La carrière de Jayavarman II., Bulletin de l'EFEO (Paris), 59 (1972): 205-220.
 Jacques, Claude. On Jayavarman II., the Founder of the Khmer Empire. Southeast Asian Archaeology 3 (1992): 1-5.
 Jackson, Rees and Dau Du Gau "The Khmer Empire: Jayavarman the II/History" (2001) (New-Zealand)

External links
 Jayavarman II at History Today''

8th-century Cambodian monarchs
Hindu monarchs
Khmer Empire
Cambodian Hindus
Year of birth unknown
Year of death unknown
9th-century Cambodian monarchs
Cambodian people of Indonesian descent